Cérilly may refer to the following places in France:

 Cérilly, Allier, a commune in the department of Allier
 Cérilly, Côte-d'Or, a commune in the department of Côte-d'Or
 Cérilly, Yonne, a commune in the department of Yonne